Admiral Sir Augustus William James Clifford, 1st Baronet,  (26 May 1788 – 8 February 1877) was a British Royal Navy officer, court official, and usher of the Black Rod.

Personal life
Clifford was born in France in 1788, the illegitimate son of William Cavendish, 5th Duke of Devonshire (and 7th Baron Clifford) (1748–1811), and Lady Elizabeth Foster (1759–1824), daughter of Frederick Hervey, 4th Earl of Bristol. Not long after his birth, his mother brought him to England, to be wet-nursed by Louisa Augusta Marshall, wife of the Rev John Marshall, curate at Clewer, near Windsor, Berkshire. Clifford was educated at Harrow School, 1796–99. His parents married in 1809, their respective spouses having died.

He married, on 20 October 1813, Lady Elizabeth Frances Townshend (2 August 1789 – 10 April 1862 Nice), sister of John Townshend, 4th Marquess Townshend. Each of his sons, Capt William RN, Robert and Charles succeeded their father in turn as the second, third and fourth (and final) baronets.

Clifford was a patron of the arts, and formed a unique collection of paintings, sculpture, etchings, engravings, and bijouterie. He died at his residence in the House of Lords in 1877.

Naval career
Clifford entered the Royal Navy as a midshipman in May 1800, and was promoted to a lieutenancy in 1806. He served at the reduction of Ste. Lucie and Tobago in 1803, and throughout the operations in Egypt during 1807. He was at the capture of a convoy in the Bay of Rosas in 1809 (for which he received a medal) and in the operations on the coast of Italy 1811–12.

After this, as captain, he was for many years actively employed in naval duties, being several times mentioned in the London Gazette for his courage in cutting-out expeditions and on other occasions. For some time he was engaged in attendance on the Lord High Admiral, the Duke of Clarence, afterwards William IV. Clifford recommissioned  on 27 May 1826 to carry the Duke of Devonshire on an embassy to Russia. In 1828, in another vessel, Clifford took Lord William Bentinck out to India as governor-general. This was his last service afloat; he was not actively employed after 1831.

He reached the rank of rear-admiral 23 March 1848, vice-admiral 27 September 1855, admiral of the blue 7 November 1860, and admiral of the red 1864, becoming retired admiral 31 March 1866.

Political career
He was Member of Parliament for Bandon 1818–20; for Dungarvan, 1820–2; and again for Bandon from 23 July 1831 to 3 Dec. 1832. He was nominated a Commander of the Order of the Bath on 8 December 1815, knighted on 4 August 1830, and created a baronet on 4 August 1838. His half-brother, the 6th Duke of Devonshire (then Lord Chamberlain), appointed him on 25 July 1832 Gentleman Usher of the Black Rod, which office he held, much to his satisfaction, until his death. On various occasions between 1843 and 1866 he acted as deputy lord great chamberlain of England, in the absence of Lord Willoughby d'Eresby.

Ancestry

References

Further reading

External links 

|-

|-

1788 births
1877 deaths
Royal Navy admirals
Baronets in the Baronetage of the United Kingdom
Royal Navy personnel of the Napoleonic Wars
Gentlemen Ushers
Cavendish family
People educated at Harrow School
UK MPs 1818–1820
UK MPs 1820–1826
UK MPs 1831–1832
Companions of the Order of the Bath
Ushers of the Black Rod
Members of the Parliament of the United Kingdom for County Cork constituencies (1801–1922)
Members of the Parliament of the United Kingdom for County Waterford constituencies (1801–1922)